The Grapes of Wrath is the debut EP by The Grapes of Wrath, released in 1984.

Track listing 

 All tracks written by Hooper/Kane/Hooper

 "Misunderstanding" - 2:29
 "Lay Out the Trap" - 4:23
 "Down to the Wire" - 3:56
 "Laughing Out Loud" - 4:09

Personnel 
Tom Hooper – Backing Vocals, Bass
Chris Hooper  – Drums
Kevin Kane  – Guitar, Vocals
Produced By – Greg Reely

References 

1984 debut EPs
The Grapes of Wrath (band) albums
Nettwerk Records EPs